The 2000–01 Croatian Football Cup was the tenth edition of Croatia's football knockout competition. Hajduk Split were the defending champions, and it was won by Dinamo Zagreb.

Calendar

Preliminary round

First round

Second round

Quarter-finals

|}

Semi-finals

First legs

Second legs

Dinamo Zagreb won 4–2 on aggregate.

Hajduk Split won 4–0 on aggregate.

Final

First leg

Second leg

Dinamo Zagreb won 3–0 on aggregate.

See also
2000–01 Croatian First Football League
2000–01 Croatian Second Football League

External links
Official website 
2000–01 in Croatian football at Rec.Sport.Soccer Statistics Foundation

Croatian Football Cup seasons
Croatian Cup, 2000-01
Croatian Cup, 2000-01